Karin Nilsson (born 1956) is a Swedish politician of the Centre Party, substitute member of the Riksdag since 2006.

External links
Karin Nilsson at the Riksdag website

Members of the Riksdag from the Centre Party (Sweden)
Living people
1956 births
Women members of the Riksdag
21st-century Swedish women politicians
Members of the Riksdag 2006–2010
Members of the Riksdag 2010–2014